Veľké Zálužie is a village and municipality in the Nitra District in western central Slovakia, in the Nitra Region.

History
The village was established in 1261.

Geography
The village lies at an altitude of 170 metres and covers an area of 32.104 km². It has a population of about 5,480 people.

Ethnicity
The population is about 99% Slovak.

References

External links
 
 
 https://web.archive.org/web/20070513023228/http://www.statistics.sk/mosmis/eng/run.html

Villages and municipalities in Nitra District